KUKN (105.5 FM, "Cookin' Country") is a radio station broadcasting a country music format. Licensed to Longview, Washington, United States, the station is currently owned by Washington Interstate Broadcasting, Inc.

KUKN-HD2
KUKN-HD2 (101.5 K268BN FM, "101.5 The Blitz") is a radio station broadcasting an active rock format. 

On November 5, 2021, KUKN-HD2 dropped its adult hits formats and began stunting with Christmas music as "101.5 The Sleigh". On December 26, 2021, KUKN flipped to active rock as 101.5 The Blitz.

On May 16th, 2022, KUKN-HD2, “101.5 The Blitz”, introduced its first official on air lineup. Their morning show, Mood Killers with Marconi Bologna and Eddie Barella, airs 6-10a. John Paul hosts middays 10a-3p. Pork Chop hosts afternoons 3-8p.

References

External links

Country radio stations in the United States
UKN
Longview, Washington
1968 establishments in Washington (state)